Nuran (also Romanized as Nūrān) is a village in Abolfares Rural District, in the Central District of Ramhormoz County, Khuzestan Province, Iran. At the 2006 census, its population was 55, in 13 families.

References 

Populated places in Ramhormoz County